Christian Doermer (5 July 1935 – 14 July 2022) was a German actor and director. He appeared in more than 80 films and television shows from 1954 to 2022. He starred in the 1966 film No Shooting Time for Foxes. The film was entered into the 16th Berlin International Film Festival, where it won the Silver Bear Extraordinary Jury Prize. In 1969, Doermer appeared as a German soldier attending the Christmas truce in Sir Richard Attenborough's satirical World War I musical film Oh! What a Lovely War. 

Doermer himself has also directed a fair number of films including documentaries and television films. In 1962, he was one of the 26 authors of the famous Oberhausen Manifesto, demanding a change in German film.

Selected filmography

 The Forest House in Tyrol (1955) as Alfons Attinger
  (1956), as Jochen
 Teenage Wolfpack (1956), as Jan Borchert
 All Roads Lead Home (1957), as Michael
 Der Stern von Afrika (1957), as Unteroffizier Klein
 Precocious Youth (1957), as Wolfgang
 Adorable Arabella (1959),  as Helmut Hagemann
  (1961), as Claus Baade
 Das Riesenrad (1961), as Hubert von Hill jr.
  (1962, TV miniseries), as Gerald Quincey
 Die Revolution entläßt ihre Kinder (1962, TV miniseries), as Wolfgang Leonhard
 Terror After Midnight (1962), as Nolan Stoddard
 The Bread of Those Early Years (1962), as Walter Fendrich
 Love at Twenty (1962), as Tonio
  (1964), as Mario
 No Shooting Time for Foxes (1966), as Viktor
 Die Rechnung – eiskalt serviert (1966), as Tommy Wheeler
 The Syndicate (1968), as Kurt Hohmann
 Joanna (1968), as Hendrik Casson
 Oh! What a Lovely War (1969), as Fritz
 Downhill Racer (1969), as the German skier at the Winter Olympics
 Lettow-Vorbeck: Der deutsch-ostafrikanische Imperativ (1984, directed by Christian Doermer)
 Väter und Söhne – Eine deutsche Tragödie (1986, TV miniseries), as Dr. Körner
 The Hothouse (1987), as Felix Keetenheuve
  (1991, TV film), as Abraham Esau
 Stauffenberg (2004, TV film), as Field marshal Wilhelm Keitel

References

External links

1935 births
2022 deaths
People from Rostock
German male film actors
German male television actors
20th-century German male actors
German Film Award winners